Rudbar Rural District is a rural district (dehestan) in the Ruydar District of Khamir County, Hormozgan Province, Iran. At the 2006 census, its population was 3,079, in 701 families.  The rural district has 9 villages.

References 

Rural Districts of Hormozgan Province
Khamir County